The Royal Suppliants is a 1781 tragedy by John Delap.

The original Drury Lane cast included  William 'Gentleman' Smith as Acamas, John Bannister as Hyllus, James Aickin as Iolaus, William Farren as Alcander, John Hayman Packer as Thestor, Robert Palmer as Officer, Robert Bensley as Demophon and Elizabeth Farren as Macaria. It was dedicated to Henry Temple, 2nd Viscount Palmerston.

References

Bibliography
 Nicoll, Allardyce. A History of English Drama 1660-1900: Volume III. Cambridge University Press, 2009.
 Hogan, C.B (ed.) The London Stage, 1660-1800: Volume V. Southern Illinois University Press, 1968.

1781 plays
British plays
Tragedy plays
West End plays